The Herman Ridder Junior High School (also known as Public School 98) is a middle school in the Morrisania section of the Bronx, part of the New York City Department of Education.  Constructed in 1929–31, the building is a New York City Landmark Art Deco structure designed by Walter C. Martin.  It is named after Herman Ridder, a prominent newspaper publisher and editor.

Notable alumni
Stan Getz, jazz saxophonist
Hal Linden, stage and screen actor, television director and musician
Anibal Lopez, bodybuilder
Al Pacino, actor of stage and screen, filmmaker, and screenwriter
Regina Resnik, international opera singer
Paul Stanley, singer, songwriter, KISS frontman

In popular culture
The school appears in the Baz Luhrmann  television show The Get Down

References

Public middle schools in the Bronx
Educational institutions established in 1931
1931 establishments in New York City
Morrisania, Bronx
Art Deco architecture in the Bronx
New York City Designated Landmarks in the Bronx